The 10th National Congress of the Lao People's Revolutionary Party (LPRP) was held in Vientiane from 18–22 January 2016.  The congress occurs once every five years. A total of 685 delegates represented the party's 252,879 card-carrying members.

10th CC plenary session
The 1st Plenary Session of the 10th Central Committee elected the 10th Politburo and the 10th Secretariat. 11 people were elected to the Politburo, and nine to the Secretariat. It elected Bounnhang Vorachith LPRP General Secretary, Phankham Viphavan as Executive Secretary of the Secretariat and Bounthong Chitmany as Chairman of the Inspection Committee. Former General Secretary Choummaly Sayasone stepped down alongside former Politburo members Thongsing Thammavong, Asang Laoly and Somsavat Lengsavad. Bounnhang closed the proceedings by remarking that the elected members were qualified since most of them had been active participants in the war of national liberation.

Topics of Discussion 
Among topics discussed were ending fiscal misappropriation and attracting foreign investment. Presented at the Congress were
 the 8th National Socio-Economic Development Plan, which strives to remove Laos from the list of the world's most underdeveloped countries by 2020,
 the socio-economic development strategy for 2016-2025,
 the 2030 vision report, and
 the Party statutes.
It also hopes to further bolster Laos by developing it into an upper-middle income state by 2030.

References

Congresses of the Lao People's Revolutionary Party
2016 in Laos
2016 conferences